General Barker may refer to:

Desmond Barker (1949–2021), South African Air Force major general
Evelyn Barker (1894–1983), British Army general
George Digby Barker (1833–1914), British Army general
George Robert Barker (1817–1861), British Army brigadier general
John William Barker (1872–1924), U.S. Army brigadier general
Michael Barker (British Army officer) (1884–1960), British Army lieutenant general
Ray Barker (1889–1974), U.S. Army major general
Sir Robert Barker, 1st Baronet (1732–1789), British Army brigadier general
Vincent B. Barker (fl. 1980s–2020s), U.S. Army major general